Lebeda pruetti is a moth of the family Lasiocampidae first described by Jeremy Daniel Holloway in 1987. It is found on Borneo.

The wingspan is 35 mm for males and 53 mm for females

External links

Lasiocampinae
Moths described in 1987